The Walt Disney World Resort, also called Walt Disney World or Disney World, is an entertainment resort complex in Bay Lake and Lake Buena Vista, Florida, United States, near the cities of Orlando and Kissimmee. Opened on October 1, 1971, the resort is operated by Disney Parks, Experiences and Products, a division of The Walt Disney Company. The resort comprises four theme parks (Magic Kingdom, Epcot, Disney's Hollywood Studios, and Disney's Animal Kingdom), two water parks (Disney's Blizzard Beach and Disney's Typhoon Lagoon), 31 themed resort hotels, nine non-Disney hotels, several golf courses, a camping resort, and other entertainment venues, including the outdoor shopping center Disney Springs. On October 1, 2021, Walt Disney World started its celebration of its 50-year anniversary which will last for 18 consecutive months ending on March 31, 2023.

Designed to supplement Disneyland in Anaheim, California, which had opened in 1955, the complex was developed by Walt Disney in the 1960s. "The Florida Project", as it was known, was intended to present a distinct vision with its own diverse set of attractions. Walt Disney's original plans also called for the inclusion of an "Experimental Prototype Community of Tomorrow" (EPCOT), a planned community intended to serve as a testbed for new city-living innovations. Walt Disney died on December 15, 1966, during the initial planning of the complex. After his death, the company wrestled with the idea of whether to bring the Disney World project to fruition; however, Walt's older brother, Roy O. Disney, came out of retirement to make sure Walt's biggest dream was realized. Construction started in 1967, with the company instead building a resort similar to Disneyland, abandoning the experimental concepts for a planned community. The Magic Kingdom was the first theme park to open in the complex, in 1971, followed by Epcot (1982), Disney's Hollywood Studios (1989), and Disney's Animal Kingdom (1998). It was Roy who insisted the name of the entire complex be changed from Disney World to Walt Disney World, ensuring that people would remember that the project was Walt's dream.

In 2018, Walt Disney World was the most visited vacation resort in the world, with an average annual attendance of more than 58 million. The resort is the flagship destination of Disney's worldwide corporate enterprise and has become a popular staple in American culture. , Walt Disney World was chosen to host the NBA Bubble for play of the 2019–20 season of the National Basketball Association (NBA) to resume at the ESPN Wide World of Sports Complex. Walt Disney World is also covered by an FAA prohibited airspace zone that restricts all airspace activities without approval from the federal government of the United States, including usage of drones; this level of protection is otherwise only offered to American critical infrastructure (like the Pantex nuclear weapons plant), military bases, the Washington, DC Metropolitan Area Special Flight Rules Area, official presidential travels, and Camp David.

On April 22, 2022, Florida Governor Ron DeSantis signed a bill into law which would officially strip the Walt Disney Company of its longtime self-governing status in the area around Walt Disney World by June 2023. The repeal of Disney's special status was widely seen as retaliation against the company for its opposition to Florida's Parental Rights in Education Act, known as the "Don't Say Gay" bill by critics.

History

Planning and construction

Conception

In 1959, Walt Disney Productions began looking for land to house a second resort to supplement Disneyland in Anaheim, California, which had opened in 1955. Market surveys at the time revealed that only 5% of Disneyland's visitors came from east of the Mississippi River, where 75% of the population of the United States lived. Additionally, Walt Disney disliked the businesses that had sprung up around Disneyland and wanted more control over a larger area of land in the next project.

Walt Disney took a flight over a potential site in Orlando, Florida—one of many—in November 1963. After witnessing the well-developed network of roads and taking the planned construction of both Interstate 4 and Florida's Turnpike into account, with McCoy Air Force Base (later Orlando International Airport) to the east, Disney selected a centrally located site near Bay Lake. The development was referred to in-house as "The Florida Project". To avoid a burst of land speculation, Walt Disney Productions used various dummy corporations to acquire  of land. In May 1965, some of these major land transactions were recorded a few miles southwest of Orlando in Osceola County. In addition, two large tracts totaling $1.5 million were sold, and smaller tracts of flatlands and cattle pastures were purchased by exotically named companies, such as the "Ayefour Corporation", "Latin-American Development and Management Corporation", and the "Reedy Creek Ranch Corporation". Some are now memorialized on a window above Main Street, U.S.A. in the Magic Kingdom. The smaller parcels of land acquired were called "outs". They were  lots platted in 1912 by the Munger Land Company and sold to investors. Most of the owners in the 1960s were happy to get rid of the land, which was mostly swamp at the time. Another issue was the mineral rights to the land, which were owned by Tufts University. Without the transfer of these rights, Tufts could come in at any time and demand the removal of buildings to obtain minerals. Eventually, Disney's team negotiated a deal with Tufts to buy the mineral rights for $15,000.

Working strictly in secrecy, real estate agents unaware of their client's identity began making offers to landowners in April 1964, in parts of southwest Orange and northwest Osceola counties. The agents were careful not to reveal the extent of their intentions, and they were able to negotiate numerous land contracts with some landowners, including large tracts of land for as little as $100 an acre. With the understanding that the recording of the first deeds would trigger intense public scrutiny, Disney delayed the filing of paperwork until a large portion of the land was under contract.

Early rumors and speculation about the land purchases assumed possible development by NASA in support of the nearby Kennedy Space Center, as well as references to other famous investors, such as Ford, the Rockefellers, and Howard Hughes. An Orlando Sentinel news article published weeks later, on May 20, 1965, acknowledged a popular rumor that Disney was building an "East Coast" version of Disneyland. However, the publication denied its accuracy based on an earlier interview with Disney at Kennedy Space Center, in which he claimed a $50 million investment was in the works for Disneyland, and that he had no interest in building a new park. In October 1965, editor Emily Bavar from the Sentinel visited Disneyland during the park's 10th-anniversary celebration. In an interview with Disney, she asked him if he was behind recent land purchases in Central Florida. Bavar later described that Disney "looked like I had thrown a bucket of water in his face", before denying the story. His reaction, combined with other research obtained during her Anaheim visit, led Bavar to author a story on October 21, 1965, where she predicted that Disney was building a second theme park in Florida. Three days later, after gathering more information from various sources, the Sentinel published another article headlined, "We Say: 'Mystery Industry' Is Disney".

Walt Disney had originally planned to publicly reveal Disney World on November 15, 1965, but in light of the Sentinel story, Disney asked Florida Governor Haydon Burns to confirm the story on October 25. His announcement called the new theme park "the greatest attraction in the history of Florida". The official reveal was kept on the previously planned November 15 date, and Disney joined Burns in Orlando for the event.

Roy Disney's oversight of construction

Walt Disney died from circulatory collapse caused by smoking-related lung cancer on December 15, 1966, before his vision was realized. His brother and business partner, Roy O. Disney, postponed his retirement to oversee construction of the resort's first phase.

On February 2, 1967, Roy O. Disney held a press conference at the Park Theatres in Winter Park, Florida. The role of EPCOT was emphasized in the film that was played. After the film, it was explained that for Disney World, including EPCOT, to succeed, a special district would have to be formed: the Reedy Creek Improvement District with two cities inside it, Bay Lake and Reedy Creek, now Lake Buena Vista. In addition to the standard powers of an incorporated city, which include issuance of tax-free bonds, the district would have immunity from any current or future county or state land-use laws. The only areas where the district had to submit to the county and state would be property taxes and elevator inspections. The legislation forming the district and the two cities, one of which was the Reedy Creek Improvement Act, was signed into law by Florida Governor Claude R. Kirk, Jr. on May 12, 1967. The Supreme Court of Florida then ruled in 1968 that the district was allowed to issue tax-exempt bonds for public projects within the district, despite the sole beneficiary being Walt Disney Productions.

The district soon began construction of drainage canals, and Disney built the first roads and the Magic Kingdom. The Contemporary Resort Hotel and the Polynesian Village Resort were also completed in time for the park's opening on October 1, 1971. The Palm and Magnolia golf courses near the Magic Kingdom had opened a few weeks before, while Fort Wilderness opened one month later. Twenty-four days after the park opened, Roy O. Disney dedicated the property and declared that it would be known as "Walt Disney World", in his brother's honor. In his own words: "Everyone has heard of Ford cars. But have they all heard of Henry Ford, who started it all? Walt Disney World is in memory of the man who started it all, so people will know his name as long as Walt Disney World is here." After the dedication, Roy Disney asked Walt's widow, Lillian, what she thought of Walt Disney World. According to biographer Bob Thomas, she responded, "I think Walt would have approved." Roy Disney died at age 78 on December 20, 1971, less than three months after the property opened.

Admission prices in 1971 were $3.50 for adults, $2.50 for juniors under age 18, and one dollar for children under twelve.

1980s–2020

Much of Walt Disney's plans for his Progress City concept were abandoned after his death and after the company board decided that it did not want to be in the business of running a city. The concept evolved into the resort's second theme park, EPCOT Center, which opened in 1982 (renamed EPCOT in 1996). While still emulating Walt Disney's original idea of showcasing new technology, the park is closer to a world's fair than a "community of tomorrow". One of EPCOT's main attractions is the "World Showcase", which highlights 11 countries across the globe. Some of the urban planning concepts from the original idea of EPCOT would instead be integrated into the community of Celebration, Florida, much later. The resort's third theme park, Disney-MGM Studios (renamed Disney's Hollywood Studios in 2008), opened in 1989 and is inspired by show business.

In the early 1990s, the resort was seeking permits for expansion. There was considerable environmentalist push-back, and the resort was convinced to engage in mitigation banking. In an agreement with The Nature Conservancy and the state of Florida, Disney purchased  of land, adjacent to the park for the purpose of rehabilitating wetland ecosystems. The Disney Wilderness Preserve was established in April 1993, and the land was subsequently transferred to The Nature Conservancy. The Walt Disney Company provided additional funds for landscape restoration and wildlife monitoring.

The resort's fourth theme park, Disney's Animal Kingdom, opened in 1998.

In October 2009, Disney World announced a competition to find a town to become twinned with. In December 2009, after Rebecca Warren won the competition with a poem, they announced the resort will be twinned with the English town of Swindon.

George Kalogridis was named president of the resort in December 2012, replacing Meg Crofton, who had overseen the site since 2006.

On January 21, 2016, the resort's management structure was changed, with general managers within a theme park being in charge of an area or land, instead of on a functional basis, as previously configured. Theme parks have already had a vice-president overseeing them. Disney Springs and Disney Sports were also affected. Now hotel general managers manage a single hotel instead of some managing multiple hotels.

On October 18, 2017, it was announced that resort visitors could bring pet dogs to Disney's Yacht Club Resort, Disney's Port Orleans Resort – Riverside, Disney's Art of Animation Resort, and Disney's Fort Wilderness Resort & Campground.

In 2019, Josh D'Amaro replaced George Kalogridis as president of the resort. He had previously held the position of vice president of Animal Kingdom. D'Amaro was subsequently promoted to chairman of Disney Parks, Experiences and Products in May 2020, succeeding Bob Chapek, who was promoted to CEO of The Walt Disney Company in February 2020. Jeff Vahle, who served as president of Disney Signature Experiences subsequently took over as president of the resort.

March 2020–present
On March 12, 2020, a Disney spokesperson announced that Disney World and Disneyland Paris would temporarily shutter due to the pandemic, beginning March 15, 2020.

In 2020, Disney World laid off 6,500 employees and only operated at 25% capacity after reopening during the COVID-19 pandemic.

, Walt Disney World was chosen to host the NBA Bubble for play of the 2019–20 season of the National Basketball Association (NBA) to resume at the ESPN Wide World of Sports Complex. It was also the site for the MLS is Back Tournament, also held at the Sports Complex.

On July 11, 2020, Disney World officially reopened, beginning operations at 25% capacity at the Magic Kingdom and Disney's Animal Kingdom, as a result of the COVID-19 pandemic in Florida. Four days later, Epcot and Disney's Hollywood Studios for operation at 25% capacity to the public. Masks were required at all times (including outdoors, on attractions, and while taking photos), all guests were required to have their temperature taken upon entry, plexiglass was installed on various attractions and transportation offerings, and shows that drew large crowds, such as parades and nighttime shows including Fantasmic! and Happily Ever After were not offered.

In November 2020, the resort increased the guest capacity to 35% at all four theme parks, and on May 13, 2021, CEO Bob Chapek announced a further increase of capacity, effective immediately; however, he did not say to what capacity level it would be raised. By mid-June 2021, temperature checks and mask mandates (except while on Disney transportation) had been lifted. In late July 2021, mask mandates were reinstated for all attractions and indoor areas in light of new guidance issued by the Centers for Disease Control as the delta variant drove a significant increase in local cases. These reinstated mandates were lifted in February 2022. In April 2022, following a court decision ending the federal mask mandate for public transportation, the mask mandates on Disney transportation were lifted.

Starting on October 1, 2021, the resort is honoring its 50th anniversary with "The World's Most Magical Celebration".

Disney's Magical Express, a complimentary transportation and luggage service offered to Walt Disney Resort guests that began in 2005, ended in January 2022. In August 2021, the Walt Disney Company announced that FastPass+, which had been free since its introduction in 1999, would be retired and replaced with Genie+, a system costing guests $15 per day with the option of adding "Lightning Lane," which will be used for top-tier attractions, for an additional charge.

On April 22, 2022, the self-governing status which the Walt Disney Company had in the area around Disney World for more than 50 years came to an end after Florida Governor Ron DeSantis signed into law legislation requiring the area to come under the legal jurisdiction of the state of Florida. The new law would also officially abolish The Reedy Creek Improvement District which the Walt Disney Company has used to run the area since May 1967, when former Florida Governor Claude Kirk signed into law legislation which granted the company special status. The law goes into effect in June of 2023.

Timeline

Future expansion
The resort has a number of expansion projects planned or ongoing, including:
 Enhancements at Epcot continue, including a walkthrough attraction Journey of Water, inspired by Moana in World Nature, and Dreamers Point as a newly designed central spine, which will include a statue of Walt Disney and Mickey Mouse, along with a new 1-level festival pavilion as CommuniCore Hall and Plaza in World Celebration. The Play! Pavilion was also announced to be coming to Epcot, using to building formerly occupied by Wonders of Life, in World Discovery.
 Flamingo Crossings, a shopping complex similar to Disney Springs, currently opening in phases.

Location

The Florida resort is not within Orlando city limits but is southwest of Downtown Orlando. Much of the resort is in southwestern Orange County, with the remainder in adjacent Osceola County. The property includes the cities of Lake Buena Vista and Bay Lake which are governed by the Reedy Creek Improvement District. The site is accessible from Central Florida's Interstate 4 via Exits 62B (World Drive), 64B (US 192 West), 65B (Osceola Parkway West), 67B (SR 536 West), and 68 (SR 535 North), Exit 6 on SR 417 South, the Central Florida GreeneWay and Exit 8 on SR 429, the Western Beltway. Portions of the property have since been sold or de-annexed, including land now occupied by the Disney-built community of Celebration. The company acquired nearly 3,000 additional acres, in separate transactions, between December 2018 and April 2020.

Attractions

Theme parks
 Magic Kingdom, opened October 1, 1971
 Epcot, opened October 1, 1982
 Disney's Hollywood Studios, opened May 1, 1989
 Disney's Animal Kingdom, opened April 22, 1998

Water parks
 Disney's Typhoon Lagoon, opened June 1, 1989
 Disney's Blizzard Beach, opened April 1, 1995

Other attractions

 Multiple resorts across Disney property offer a variety of spa treatments including Disney's Grand Floridian and Disney's Coronado Springs Resort
 Disney's Boardwalk, located outside of their Boardwalk Inn, functions as an entertainment, dining, and shopping district.
 Epcot has annual festivals that run for limited amounts of time throughout the year like the Epcot Flower and Garden Festival, Epcot Festival of the Arts, Epcot Festival of the Holidays and the Epcot Food and Wine Festival
 Disney does special ticketed events throughout the year including the Mickey's Not So Scary Halloween Party, which usually runs late August through October, and Mickey's Very Merry Christmas Party
 Disney Springs, opened March 22, 1975 (Previously known as Lake Buena Vista Shopping Village, Disney Village Marketplace, and Downtown Disney)
 Disney's Wedding Pavilion, opened July 15, 1995
 ESPN Wide World of Sports, opened March 28, 1997
 Drawn to Life by Cirque du Soleil – opened November 18, 2021

Golf and recreation
Disney's property includes four golf courses. The three 18-hole golf courses are Disney's Palm (4.5 stars), Disney's Magnolia (4 stars), and Disney's Lake Buena Vista (4 stars). There is also a nine-hole walking course (no electric carts allowed) called Oak Trail, designed for young golfers. The Magnolia and Palm courses played home to the PGA Tour's Children's Miracle Network Hospitals Classic. Arnold Palmer Golf Management manages the Disney golf courses.

Additionally, there are two themed miniature golf complexes, each with two courses, Fantasia Gardens and Winter Summerland. The two courses at Fantasia Gardens are Fantasia Garden and Fantasia Fairways. The Garden course is a traditional miniature-style course based on the "Fantasia" movies with musical holes, water fountains and characters. Fantasia Fairways is a traditional golf course on miniature scale having water hazards and sand traps.

The two courses at Winter Summerland are Summer and Winter, both themed around Santa. Summer is the more challenging of the two 18-hole courses.

Former attractions
 Discovery Island – an island in Bay Lake that was home to many species of animals and birds. It opened on April 8, 1974, and closed on April 8, 1999.
 Disney's River Country – the first water park at the Walt Disney World Resort. It opened on June 20, 1976, and closed on November 2, 2001.
 Walt Disney World Speedway – a racetrack at Walt Disney World and included the Richard Petty Driving Experience. It opened November 28, 1995, and closed on August 9, 2015.
 DisneyQuest – an indoor interactive theme park that featured many arcade games and virtual attractions. It opened June 19, 1998 as part of an unsuccessful attempt to launch a chain of similar theme parks. It closed on July 2, 2017, to be replaced by the NBA Experience.
 La Nouba by Cirque du Soleil – opened December 23, 1998, and closed after December 31, 2017.

Resorts

Of the thirty-four resorts and hotels on the Walt Disney World property, 28 are owned and operated by Walt Disney Parks, Experiences and Consumer Products. These are classified into four categories—Deluxe, Moderate, Value, and Disney Vacation Club Villas—and are located in one of five resort areas: the Magic Kingdom, Epcot, Wide World of Sports, Animal Kingdom, or Disney Springs resort areas. There is also the Other Select Deluxe Resorts category used to describe two resorts in the Epcot Resorts Area that carry Walt Disney World branding but are managed by a third party.

While all of the Deluxe resort hotels have achieved an AAA Four Diamond rating, Disney's Grand Floridian Resort & Spa is considered the highest-tier flagship luxury resort on the Walt Disney World Resort complex.

On-site Disney resorts

On-site non-Disney resorts

Former resorts
 The Golf Resort – Became The Disney Inn, and later became Shades of Green.
 Disney's Village Resort – Became the Villas at Disney Institute and then Disney's Saratoga Springs Resort & Spa. The "Tree House" Villas were decommissioned for a time because they were not accessible to disabled guests. Until early 2008, they were used for International Program Cast Member housing. In February 2008, Disney submitted plans to the South Florida Water Management District to replace the 60 existing villas with 60 new villas. The Treehouse Villas opened during the summer of 2009.
 Celebration – a town designed and built by Disney, now managed by a resident-run association.
 Lake Buena Vista – Disney originally intended this area to become a complete community with multiple residences, shopping, and offices, but transformed the original homes into hotel lodging in the 1970s, which were demolished in the early 2000s to build Disney's Saratoga Springs Resort & Spa

Never-built resorts
 Disney's Asian Resort
 Disney's Persian Resort
 Disney's Venetian Resort
 Disney's Mediterranean Resort
 Fort Wilderness Junction
 Reflections – A Disney Lakeside Lodge

Attendance

In the first year of opening, the park attracted 10,712,991 visitors. In 2018, the resort's four theme parks all ranked in the top 9 on the list of the 25 most visited theme parks in the world: (1st) Magic Kingdom—20,859,000 visitors; (6th) Disney's Animal Kingdom—13,750,000 visitors; (7th) Epcot—12,444,000 visitors; and (9th) Disney's Hollywood Studios—11,258,000 visitors. By October 2020, maximum Disney World attendance was still allowed to only remain at 25% capacity due to the COVID-19 pandemic. A recent study found that reducing Magic Kingdom park capacity to 25% would result in a 54.1% reduction in annual attendance. This capacity limit causes less annual revenue, and may lower the number of visitors to the Orlando region.

Operations

Transportation

The Walt Disney World Resort is serviced by Disney Transport, a complimentary mass transportation system allowing guest access across the property. The fare-free system utilizes buses, monorails, gondola lifts, watercraft, and parking lot trams.

The Walt Disney World Monorail System provides free transportation at Walt Disney World; guests can board the monorail and travel between the Magic Kingdom and Epcot, including select on-property resorts such as The Grand Floridian and The Polynesian Village. The system operates on three routes that interconnect at the Transportation and Ticket Center (TTC), adjacent to the Magic Kingdom's parking lot. Disney Transport owns a fleet of Disney-operated buses on the property, that is also complimentary for guests. 

A gondola lift system, dubbed Disney Skyliner, opened in 2019. The system's three lines connect Disney's Hollywood Studios and Epcot with four resort hotels.

Disney Transport also operates a fleet of watercraft, ranging in size from water taxis, up to the ferries that connect the Magic Kingdom to the Transportation and Ticket Center. Disney Transport is also responsible for maintaining the fleet of parking lot trams that are used for shuttling visitors between the various theme park parking lots and their respective main entrances.

In addition to its free transportation methods, in conjunction with Lyft, Walt Disney World also offers a vehicle for hire service for a fee. The Minnie Van Service are Chevy Traverses dressed in a Minnie Mouse red-and-white polka dot design that can accommodate up to six people and have two carseats available to anyone that is within the Walt Disney World Resort limits. Cast members can install the car seats. Some of the unique advantages that the Minnie Van Service offers over a normal ride share is the ability to be dropped off in the Magic Kingdom bus loop (instead of at the TTC like the other ride shares) and being able to ride to any point in Fort Wilderness.

Parking
Upon arriving at the park, there are several lots that can be used to park vehicles. At the theme parks, which include Animal Kingdom, Magic Kingdom, Epcot and Hollywood Studios, there is a single lot used. Guests are able to access each of these four parks when their vehicle is left in one of these lots. Guests have the choice to buy a pass for either standard parking or preferred parking. Preferred parking can be purchased for a higher cost, however, it allows guests to park their vehicle closer to the park entrance. Trams are available to guests at no cost. They provide transportation from the parking lot to the main entrance. Parking areas are also available to those with disabilities. These designated parking lots allow for guests with disabilities to park a shorter distance from the park entrances to minimize any traveling that is necessary. Additionally, guests are given the option of valet parking at an extra cost.

Employment
When the Magic Kingdom opened in 1971, the site employed about 5,500 "cast members". In 2020, Walt Disney World employs more than 77,000 cast members. The largest single-site employer in the United States, Walt Disney World has more than 3,000 job classifications with a total 2019 payroll of over $3 billion. The resort also sponsors and operates the Walt Disney World College Program, an internship program that offers American college students (CPs) the opportunity to live in Flamingo Crossings Village, a Disney-owned apartment complex, and work at the resort, and thereby provides much of the theme park and resort "front line" cast members. There is also the Walt Disney World International College Program, an internship program that offers international college students (ICPs) from all over the world the same opportunity. In September 2020, the Walt Disney Company began laying off 6,500 Walt Disney World employees.

Energy use
Walt Disney World requires an estimated  of electricity annually, costing the company nearly $100 million in annual energy consumption. In addition to relying primarily on fossil fuels and nuclear energy from the state's power grid, Walt Disney World has two solar energy facilities on property; a  Mickey Mouse-shaped solar panel farm near Epcot, and a  facility near Disney's Animal Kingdom. The larger facility produces enough solar energy to provide electricity to two of the resort's theme parks. The sites are operated by Duke Energy and the Reedy Creek Improvement District, respectively.

The entire Disney Transport bus fleet uses R50 renewable diesel fuel, obtained from used cooking oil and non-consumable food waste from the resort.

Corporate culture
Walt Disney World's corporate culture uses jargon based on theatrical terminology. For example, park visitors are always "guests", employees are called "cast members", rides are "attractions" or "experiences", cast members costumed as famous Disney characters in a way that does not cover their faces are known as "face characters", jobs are "roles", and public and nonpublic areas are respectively labeled "onstage" and "backstage".

Self-Government and security

Disney's security personnel are generally dressed in typical security guard uniforms, though some of the personnel are dressed as tourists in plain clothes. Since September 11, 2001, uniformed security has been stationed outside each Disney park in Florida to search guests' bags as they enter the parks. Starting April 3, 2017, bag checkpoints have been placed at Magic Kingdom's resort monorail entryways and the Transportation and Ticket Center's ferry entry points prior to embarkation as well as the walkway from Disney's Contemporary Resort. Guests arriving at the Transportation and Ticket Center by tram or tour bus will be screened at the former tram boarding areas. Guests arriving by Disney Resort hotel bus or Minnie Van have their own bag check just outside the bus stops. Guests arriving via Magic Kingdom Resort boat launch are bag checked on the arrival dock outside Magic Kingdom.

The land where Walt Disney World resides is part of the Reedy Creek Improvement District (RCID), a governing jurisdiction created on May 1967 by the State of Florida at the request of Disney. RCID provides 911 services, fire, environmental protection, building code enforcement, utilities and road maintenance, but does not provide law enforcement services. The approximately 800 security staff are instead considered employees of the Walt Disney Company. Arrests and citations are issued by the Florida Highway Patrol along with the Orange County and Osceola County sheriffs deputies who patrol the roads. Disney security does maintain a fleet of security vans equipped with flares, traffic cones, and chalk commonly used by police officers. These security personnel are charged with traffic control by the RCID and may only issue personnel violation notices to Disney and RCID employees, not the general public.

Despite the appearance of the uniformed security personnel, they are not considered a legal law enforcement agency. Disney and the Reedy Creek Improvement District were sued for access to Disney Security records by Bob and Kathy Sipkema following the death of their son at the resort in 1994. The court characterized Disney security as a "night watchman" service, not a law enforcement agency, meaning it is not subject to Florida's open records laws. An appeals court later upheld the lower court's ruling.

In late 2015, Disney confirmed the addition of randomized secondary screenings and dogs trained to detect body-worn explosives within parks, in addition to metal detectors at entrances. It has also increased the number of uniformed security personnel at Walt Disney World and Disneyland properties.

Disney Security personnel in Florida have investigated traffic accidents and issued accident reports. The forms used by Disney Security may be confused with official, government forms by some.

The Orange County Sheriff maintains an office on Disney property, but this is primarily to process guests accused of shoplifting by Disney security personnel.

Although the scattering of ashes on Disney property is illegal, The Wall Street Journal reported in October 2018 that Walt Disney World parks were becoming a popular spot for families to scatter the ashes of loved ones, with the Haunted Mansion at Magic Kingdom being the favorite location. The practice is unlawful and prohibited on Disney property, and anyone spreading cremated remains is escorted from the park.

On April 22, 2022, the Walt Disney Company's self-governing authority of all the area surrounding Walt Disney World came to an end after Florida Governor Ron DeSantis signed into law legislation requiring Walt Disney World's Reedy Creek Improvement District to come under the legal jurisdiction of the state of Florida on June 1, 2023.

Closures
Walt Disney World has had twelve unscheduled closures, ten of which have been due to hurricanes:

 September 15, 1999, due to Hurricane Floyd
 September 11, 2001, after the terrorist attacks in New York and Washington D.C.
 August 13, 2004, due to Hurricane Charley
 September 4–5, 2004, due to Hurricane Frances
 September 26, 2004, due to Hurricane Jeanne
 October 25, 2005, in the morning, due to Hurricane Wilma
 October 7, 2016, due to Hurricane Matthew
 September 10–11, 2017, due to Hurricane Irma
 September 3, 2019, for about half the day (with the exception of Epcot and Disney Springs), due to Hurricane Dorian
 March 15 – July 11, 2020, due to the COVID-19 pandemic. (excluding Disney Springs, which reopened on May 19, 2020)
 September 28-29, 2022, due to Hurricane Ian
 November 9-10, 2022, phased closure from the evening of November 9 until noon of the next day, due to Hurricane Nicole

Like its sister resort, parks at the resort may close early to accommodate various special events, such as special press events, tour groups, VIP groups, and private parties. It is common for a corporation to rent entire parks for the evening. In such cases, special passes are issued which are valid for admission to all rides and attractions. At the ticket booths and on published schedules, the guests are notified of the early closures. Then, cast members announce that the parks are closing, sometime before the private event starts, and clear the parks of guests who do not have the special passes.

In October 2020, it was revealed that full capacity attendance was still not permitted, following the COVID-19 closure which occurred earlier in the year. In July 2021, Disney World announced that all its staff workers in the US would have to be fully vaccinated against COVID-19 to return to work. It also announced that those who are unvaccinated would have a period of time to get their shots and aimed to return to full capacity for people who are immunized.

Climate

Management 

 Jeff Vahle – president 
 Maribeth Bisienere – senior vice president, resorts, transportation, and premium services
 Alison Armor – vice president, transportation operations
 Mahmud Dhanani – vice president, resorts
 Rosalyn Durant – senior vice president, Disney Springs, ESPN Wide World of Sports and water parks
 Faron Kelley – vice president, sports and water parks
 Matt Simon – vice president, Disney Springs
 Jason Kirk – senior vice president, operations
 Jim MacPhee – senior vice president, operations
 Sarah Riles – vice president, Disney's Animal Kingdom
 Jackie Swisher – vice president, Disney's Hollywood Studios
 Melissa Valiquette – vice president, Magic Kingdom

Walt Disney World's Operations division is undergoing changes to management. This is the reason for there being two senior vice presidents of operations listed, as well as the vice-presidents below them possibly being outdated.

See also
 Disney College Program
Large amusement railways
 List of Disney attractions that were never built
 List of Disney theme park attractions
 List of incidents at Walt Disney World
 Rail transport in Walt Disney Parks and Resorts
 Walt Disney Travel Company
 Walt Disney World Casting Center
 The Walt Disney World Explorer
 Walt Disney World Hospitality and Recreation Corporation
 Walt Disney World International Program

References

External links
 

 
1971 establishments in Florida
Amusement parks in Greater Orlando
Amusement parks opened in 1971
Buildings and structures in Lake Buena Vista, Florida
Buildings and structures in Osceola County, Florida
Resorts in Florida
Tourist attractions in Orange County, Florida
Tourist attractions in Osceola County, Florida
Walt Disney Parks and Resorts